Bates's shrew (Crocidura batesi) is a species of mammal in the family Soricidae. It is found in Cameroon, Republic of the Congo, Equatorial Guinea, and Gabon. Its natural habitat is subtropical or tropical moist lowland forests.  This large black shrew was first described by the British zoologist Guy Dollman in 1915, the type locality being the vicinity of the Como River in Gabon. The exact definition of this species is unclear; it is often included in Fraser's musk shrew (Crocidura poensis), or reported as Wimmer's shrew (Crocidura wimmeri). Its karyotype is 2n=50, FN-76, which is identical to the Nigerian shrew (Crocidura nigeriae), and the species complex is in need of a thorough revision.

Distribution and habitat
The Bates's shrew is native to tropical central Africa where its range extends from southern Cameroon to most of Gabon apart from the south. It has also been reported from the Central African Republic, Equatorial Guinea and nearby parts of the Republic of Congo, but these sightings are debatable because of the taxonomic uncertainty surrounding it. Its habitat is primary lowland rainforest, it not being recorded from degraded habitats.

Status
The Bates's shrew is a relatively common species with a wide range and a presumed large total population. The population trend has not been evaluated but no particular threats have been recognised apart from some measure of deforestation of its forest habitat. For these reasons, the International Union for Conservation of Nature has assessed its conservation status as being of "least concern".

References

Bates's shrew
Mammals of Cameroon
Mammals of Equatorial Guinea
Mammals of Gabon
Mammals of the Republic of the Congo
Bates's shrew
Taxonomy articles created by Polbot